Kandy Muse is the stage name of Kevin Candelario, an American drag queen, queer artist and performer most known for being the runner-up on the thirteenth season of RuPaul's Drag Race and for being part of the House of Aja.

Career
Kandy Muse was part of the House of Aja, a former drag queen who competed on the ninth season of RuPaul's Drag Race. Kandy Muse is now a member of the Doll Haus, alongside fellow former House of Aja members Dahlia Sin and Janelle No. 5.

In 2021, Kandy Muse competed on the thirteenth season of Drag Race, during which Kandy Muse portrayed a "slutty version" of LinkedIn in "Social Media: The Unverified Rusical" and Patrick Starrr in the Snatch Game episode. Kandy Muse was originally cast for the show's twelfth season.

Candelario briefly worked at Sephora before his drag career took off.

Music
In 2017, Kandy Muse was featured on Eureka O'Hara's song "Body Positivity" and appeared in the music video for Velo's "Big Dick Daddy". Serving as the song's inspiration, Kandy Muse appeared on Alaska Thunderfuck's "Sitting Alone in the VIP" as well as the accompanying music video in 2020.

Personal life
Candelario was born to parents of Dominican descent and lives in New York, as of 2021. He was born in the South Bronx, NYC, and was raised between there and the Dominican Republic.
He grew up Mormon and was baptized at 8 years old.

Discography

Filmography

Television

Web series

Music videos

Awards and nominations

See also
 LGBT culture in New York City

References

External links

 Kandy Muse at IMDb

Living people
American drag queens
People from New York (state)
Kandy Muse
Year of birth missing (living people)